Jason Butler may refer to:

Jason Aalon Butler (born 1985), American singer and activist
Jason Butler Harner (born 1970), American actor
Jason Butler Rote (born ?), American television writer